is an anime adaptation of a visual novel game of the same name by 5pb. and Nitroplus. It follows a self-proclaimed mad scientist named Rintaro Okabe who, along with his friends, invents a microwave that can send text messages into the past, leading to him discovering that he retains his memory between alternate timelines.

The series is produced by White Fox and aired in Japan from April 6, 2011, to September 13, 2011, also being simulcast on Crunchyroll. An original video animation episode was released with the final BD/DVD volume on February 22, 2012. The series has been licensed in North America by Funimation Entertainment. The ending theme for episode 22 is Fake Verthandi, which can be heard at the same moment in the visual novel. An animated film sequel, Steins;Gate: The Movie − Load Region of Déjà Vu, was released on April 20, 2013. A series of short original net animation episodes, titled Steins;Gate: Sōmei Eichi no Cognitive Computing, have also been produced in collaboration with IBM. On December 2, 2015, an alternate version of the 23rd episode was aired as a part of the rebroadcast of the series, to promote Steins;Gate 0 and its anime adaptation.



Episode list

Steins;Gate: Sōmei Eichi no Cognitive Computing (2014 ONA)(IBM Promotional Shorts)

See also
Steins;Gate: The Movie − Load Region of Déjà Vu - 2013 anime film sequel to the anime series.
Steins;Gate 0 - 2018 television anime sequel based on the Steins;Gate 0 sequel game.

References

External links
  

Lists of anime episodes
Science Adventure